The 2017 Collegiate Rugby Championship was a college rugby sevens tournament played June 3–4 at Talen Energy Stadium in Chester, Pennsylvania, a suburb of Philadelphia. It was the eighth annual Collegiate Rugby Championship, and the seventh consecutive year that the tournament was at Talen Energy Stadium (formerly known as PPL Park). The 2017 championship broke the event's two-day attendance record with 37,518 on hand. It also set the tournament record for a one-day attendance with 14,973 on Saturday. The event was broadcast on NBC and NBCSN. California won the championship.

Pool stage

Pool A

Pool B

Pool C

Pool D

Pool E

Pool F

Knockout stage

Bowl

Plate

Cup

Players

Dream Team
 Cian Barry (UCLA) 
Dylan Boast (Arkansas State)	
Harley Davidson (Life)	
Alex Dorrier (Indiana)	
Cody Melphy (Life)	
Dmontae Noble (Kutztown)	
Cristian Rodriguez (Lindenwood)	
Anthony Salaber (California)
Lorenzo Thomas (Lindenwood)	
Duncan van Schalkwyk (Life)	
Russell Webb (California)	
Dawit Workie (Dartmouth)

Source:

References 

2017
2017 rugby union tournaments for clubs
2017 in American rugby union
2017 rugby sevens competitions
2017 in sports in Pennsylvania
Collegiate Rugby